Zója Székely (born 5 May 2003) is a Hungarian artistic gymnast. She is the 2020 European silver medalist on the uneven bars and bronze medalist with the team.

Career 
Székely competed at the 2018 Junior European Championships alongside Bianka Schermann, Csenge Bácskay, Hanna Szujó, and Regina Medved, and they placed ninth in the team competition. Individually, she placed eighteenth in the all-around with a score of 49.999. She also placed sixth in the uneven bars event final with a score of 13.666.

Székely made her senior international debut at the 2019 Doha World Cup where she competed on the uneven bars and balance beam, but she did not qualify for the event finals. She then competed at the 2019 European Championships where she finished fifty-ninth in the all-around during the qualification round. At the 2019 Koper World Cup, she finished fourth on the uneven bars. She was the selected to represent Hungary at the 2019 European Games, and she qualified for the all-around final where she finished seventeenth.

Székely won the gold medal in the all-around at the 2020 Hungarian Championships. She was then selected to compete at the 2020 European Championships alongside Csenge Bácskay, Dorina Böczögő, Zsófia Kovács, and Mirtill Makovits. She won the bronze medal with the team behind Ukraine and Romania. She won the silver medal in the uneven bars event final behind Kovács.

Székely competed at the 2021 European Championships. She was initially the second reserve for the all-around final, but she was put in after Larisa Iordache withdrew due to a kidney infection. She placed sixteenth with a total score of 50.632.

At the 2022 European Championships in Munich, Székely helped Hungary qualify to the team final, where they finished seventh.

References

External links 
 
 

Living people
2003 births
Hungarian female artistic gymnasts
Gymnasts from Budapest
Gymnasts at the 2019 European Games
European Games competitors for Hungary
21st-century Hungarian women